Leptogyropsis is a genus of sea snails, marine gastropod mollusks in the family Melanodrymiidae, belonging to the clade Neomphalina.

Species
Species within the genus Leptogyropsis include:
 Leptogyropsis inflata Hasegawa, 1997
 Leptogyropsis kalinovoae B. A. Marshall, 1988
 Leptogyropsis kaltanae B. A. Marshall, 1988

References

 Higo, S., Callomon, P. & Goto, Y. (1999) Catalogue and Bibliography of the Marine Shell-Bearing Mollusca of Japan. Elle Scientific Publications, Yao, Japan, 749 pp.

External links
 Marshall, B. A. (1988). Skeneidae, Vitrinellidae and Orbitestellidae (Mollusca: Gastropoda) associated with biogenic substrata from bathyal depths off New Zealand and New South Wales. Journal of Natural History. 22(4): 949-1004

Melanodrymiidae